Chaos In Kansas is a 1989 role-playing game adventure for GURPS published by Steve Jackson Games.

Plot summary
Chaos In Kansas is an adventure in which two scenarios are set in Liberty, Kansas in the 1920s.

Publication history
Chaos In Kansas was written by James M. Hurst, with a cover by Miro Sinovcic, and was published by Steve Jackson Games in 1990 as a 32-page book.

Reception
Paul Mason reviewed Chaos In Kansas for Games International magazine, and gave it 3 stars out of 5, and stated that "All in all, the package delivers value for money, including a description of the town of Liberty which might come in useful."

References

GURPS books
Role-playing game adventures
Role-playing game supplements introduced in 1989